Nationality words link to articles with information on the nation's poetry or literature (for instance, Irish or France).

Events

Works published

United Kingdom
 Anonymous, Verses Address'd to the Imitator of the First Satire of the Second Book of Horace, "By a lady", has been attributed to Lady Mary Wortley Montagu
 John Banks, Poems on Several Occasions
 Samuel Bowden, Poetical Essays on Several Occasions, Volume 1 (Volume 2 published 1735)
 James Bramston, The Man of Taste, response to Alexander Pope's Epistle to Burlington 1731 (see also Thomas Newcomb's The Woman of Taste, below)
 John Durant Breval, writing under the pen name "Joseph Gay", Morality in Vice: An heroi-comical poem, republished this year as The Lure of Venus
 Mary Chandler, A Description of Bath
 Thomas Fitzgerald, Poems on Several Occasions
 Matthew Green, writing under the pen name "Peter Drake", The Grotto
 James Hammond, An Elegy to a Young Lady, in the Manner of Ovid, published anonymously
 John Hervey, 2nd Baron Hervey, An Epistle from a Nobleman to a Doctor of Divinity, published anonymously
 George Lyttelton, 1st Baron Lyttelton, Advice to a Lady, published anonymously
 David Mallet, Of Verbal Criticism: An epistle to Mr. Pope
 Mary Masters, Poems on Several Occasions
 Thomas Newcomb, The Woman of Taste, published anonymously, but "attribution to Newcomb is probable", according to The Concise Oxford Chronology of English Literature (occasioned by James Bramston's The Man of Taste, see above)
 Alexander Pope:
 Of the Use of Riches: An Epistle to Lord Bathurst, published this year, although the book states "1732"
 The First Satire of the Second Book of Horace, with parallel English and Latin texts (see also First Satire 1734)
 An Essay on Man, Epistles 1–3 (completed 1734),
 The Impertinent; or, A Visit to the Court, published anonymously
 Elizabeth Rowe, Letters Moral and Entertaining, in Prose and Verse (see also Letters on Various Occasions 1729, Letters Moral and Entertaining 1731)
 Jonathan Swift:
 The Life and Genuine Character of Doctor Swift (see also Verses on the Death of Dr. Swift 1739 — Swift did not die until 1745)
 On Poetry: A Rhapsody, published anonymously (see also A Rap at the Rhapsody 1734)

Other
 Jean-Baptiste-Louis Gresset, Ver-Vert, about a parrot at a convent who shocks listeners with his bad language (some sources give the year of publication as 1734); France

Births
Death years link to the corresponding "[year] in poetry" article:
 January 12 – Antoine-Marin Lemierre (died 1793), French poet and playwright
 March 18 – Christoph Friedrich Nicolai (died 1811), German writer, publisher, critic, author of satirical novels, regional historian, and a key figure of the Enlightenment in Berlin
 September 5 – Christoph Martin Wieland (died 1813), German poet, translator and editor
 Isaac Bickerstaffe (died 1812), Irish poet and playwright
 Robert Lloyd (died 1764), English poet and satirist

Deaths
Birth years link to the corresponding "[year] in poetry" article:
 Bernard Mandeville (born 1670), English philosopher, political economist, poet and satirist
 John Morgan died 1733 or 1734 (born 1688), Welsh clergyman, scholar and poet
 Richard Lewis (born c. 1700), English Colonial American

See also

 Poetry
 List of years in poetry
 List of years in literature
 18th century in poetry
 18th century in literature
 Augustan poetry
 Scriblerus Club

Notes

 "A Timeline of English Poetry" Web page of the Representative Poetry Online Web site, University of Toronto

18th-century poetry
Poetry